USS Letter B (SP-732) was a United States Navy patrol vessel in commission from 1917 to 1919.

Letter B was built in 1912 as a private "runabout"-type motorboat of the same name by the Electric Launch Company (ELCO) at Bayonne, New Jersey. On 7 May 1917, the U.S. Navy acquired her under a free lease from her owner, C. Chester Eaton of Brockton, Massachusetts, for use as a section patrol vessel during World War I. Enrolled in the Naval Coast Defense Reserve on 10 May 1917, she was commissioned as USS Letter B (SP-732) on 20 October 1917 at Norfolk, Virginia.

Assigned to the 5th Naval District, Letter B served as a harbor and shore patrol boat at Norfolk and Hampton Roads, Virginia, for the rest of World War I . She also served as a duty and emergency boat for seaplanes at Naval Air Station Norfolk.

The Navy returned Letter B to Eaton on 29 April 1919.

References

Department of the Navy Naval History and Heritage Command Online Library of Selected Images: Civilian Ships: Letter B (Motor Boat, 1912). Served as USS Letter B (SP-732) in 1917-1919
NavSource Online: Section Patrol Craft Photo Archive Letter B (SP 732)

Patrol vessels of the United States Navy
World War I patrol vessels of the United States
Ships built in Bayonne, New Jersey
1912 ships